Puneet Bisht (born 15 June 1986) is an Indian cricketer. He plays as a wicketkeeper for Meghalaya in the domestic cricket. He was a part of the Delhi Daredevils IPL team in 2012.

He was the leading run-scorer for Meghalaya in the 2018–19 Vijay Hazare Trophy, with 502 runs in eight matches. In December 2018, in the 2018–19 Ranji Trophy, he scored his maiden triple century in first-class cricket, batting for Meghalaya against Sikkim. This remains the highest first class score for a wicket keeper. He was the leading run-scorer for Meghalaya in the tournament, with 892 runs in eight matches.

See also
 List of Ranji Trophy triple centuries

References

External links

1986 births
Cricketers from Delhi
Delhi Capitals cricketers
Delhi cricketers
Indian cricketers
Living people
Meghalaya cricketers
North Zone cricketers
Prime Doleshwar Sporting Club cricketers
Wicket-keepers